The FINA World Swimming Championships (25m) or "Short Course Worlds" as they are sometimes known, is an international swimming competition. It is swum in a short course (25m) pool, and has been held in the years when FINA has not held its long course World Aquatics Championships (currently this means in even years).

Unlike the FINA World Aquatics Championships, this championship is swimming-only (the World Championships feature all 5 Aquatics disciplines), and is contested in a short course, 25-meter pool (rather than a long course, 50-meter pool).

Editions

 Record by number of gold medals –   (21 gold medals, 2004)
 Record by number of total medals –   (41 medals in total, 2004),

Events
There are men's and women's events in all four strokes, the individual medley, as well as in relays. There are also two mixed relays.

Men's events

Women's events

Mixed events

Medal table
Updated after the 2022 FINA World Swimming Championships (25 m):

See also
 List of World Swimming Championships (25 m) medalists (men)
 List of World Swimming Championships (25 m) medalists (women)
 List of World Championships records in swimming#Short course (25 m)
 Major achievements in swimming by nation

References

 
World Short Course Swimming Championships
S
FINA World Swimming Championships